"Polly Vaughn" is an Irish folk-song (Roud 166, Laws O36).

Synopsis

A man, sometimes called Johnny Randle, goes out hunting for birds. Usually this is described as being in the evening or by moonlight in the rain. He sees something white in the bushes. Thinking this is a swan, he shoots. To his horror he discovers he has killed his true love, Polly Vaughn, sheltering from the rain. Returning home, he reports his mistake to his uncle and is advised not to run away. He should stay and tell the court that it was an honest mistake. The night before Polly's funeral, her ghost appears to confirm his version of the events.

The narrator imagines all the women of the county standing in a line, with Polly shining out among them as a "fountain of snow". Since the fairest girl in the county has died the girls are said to be glad of her death. In some versions there is no scene of guilty confession and no ghost.

Commentary
We are not told of the outcome of the trial. Is he found guilty of murder or not? Would he be guilty of poaching? The emphasis on Polly's fair skin, and the reaction of all the girls of the county has led most commentators to suggest that there is a supernatural element.

Polly wears a white apron, and has a name which usually sounds like "Mailí Bhán". In Irish Gaelic, this translates as "Fair Mary".

Baring-Gould commented that there is some similarity to Celtic legends about "The Swan Maidens". (see Swan Maiden). Anne Gilchrist in the Journal of the Folksong Society (number 26) points to many tales about women turning into swans. There is a fairy tale called "An Cailin" (The Fair Girl). A version of this story was recorded as "Cailín na Gruaige Báine" on the album Aoife by Moya Brennan. In Ovid's Metamorphoses, the Aeolian prince Cephalus accidentally kills his wife Procris with a javelin while hunting. Roy Palmer compares this story to that of Polly Vaughn. This interpretation might be called the "Romantic Celtic" version, and has been embraced by Shirley Collins and others.

A more mundane interpretation is that the invention of the rifle inevitably led to an increase in accidents while hunting.  If this song had really been an echo of ancient mythology we would expect to find versions in Scotland and indeed throughout Europe. With the exception of one version in Scotland, the song has been found only in England, Ireland, USA, Australia and Canada. Moreover, there are no versions known before 1806 [there are number of versions from 1765 to 1806]. We would have expected earlier versions or fragments. This down-to-earth interpretation of the song is rare.

Hugh Shields suggested that the story might be based on a real event in Kilwarlin, co. Down.
The song is discussed in "EDS" (English Dance and song) Autumn 2006 edition.

Historical background

At the end of the eighteenth century and the start of the nineteenth century there was an increase in the use of rifles among hunters, as they became cheaper to manufacture.

The absence of any trial in the song suggests that the sympathies of the hearers were with the hunter. Swan is not a particularly tasty bird, and most hunters would have preferred to shoot deer. There are versions of this song called "This Shooting of his Dear", in which the protagonist similarly mistakes Polly for a swan, but "never shall be hung for the shooting of his dear."

Cultural relationships
The idea that someone who accidentally killed someone should not run away shows a certain confidence in the judicial system. The song is a domestic tragedy, and has no elements of class conflict.

There is a slight tendency for the name "Molly" to be used more frequently in the Irish versions of the song, and for "Polly" to be used in the English versions.

Standard references

Most traditional songs involving tragic death are included among the Child ballads. The absence of this song from that list has puzzled several commentators, since Francis Child must surely have known about the song.

It was published in Robert Jamieson's 'Popular Ballads and Songs from tradition, manuscripts and scarce editions', 1806. Jamieson writes about this song, "This is indeed a silly ditty, one of the very lowest description of vulgar English ballads which are sung about the streets in country towns and sold four or five for a halfpenny". Jamieson's opinion might have coloured Child's decision to exclude it.

Jamieson says that it also goes by the name "Lord Kenneth and Fair Ellinour"
, but nobody else has used this name for the song. This sounds like a misinterpretation, since there is a Child Ballad (number 73) called "Lord Thomas and Fair Elleanor" which involves a man killing a fair woman, but without any of the motivation of hunting for a swan.

 Roud 166
 Laws O36
 The website "irishtune" categorises this as tune number 590 "Molly Bán" Irishtune
 In Francis O'Neill and James O'Neill's "O'Neill's Music of Ireland" it is tune number 1474
 In Francis O'Neill and James O'Neill's "The Dance Music of Ireland. 1001 Gems" it is number 703.

Broadsides

Broadside printings of this song are known from:

 Pitts (London) (between 1802 and 1819)
 Disley (London)
 Kendrew (York)
 Kenedy (New York) 1884
 Pearson (Manchester)
 Haly (Cork)
 J. F. Nugent & Co (Dublin) (between 1850 and 1899)

Textual variants

The song exists under the titles:

 "Polly Vaughan"
 "Polly Vaughn"
 "Molly Bawn"
 "Molly Ban"
 "Molly Bender"
 "Molly Bond"
 "Molly Vaughan"
 "Molly Van"
 "Polly Von"
 "The Shooting of His Dear"
 "As Jimmie Went A-Hunting"
 "The Fowler"
 "An Cailin Bán" (instrumental version)
 "Fair Haired Molly" (instrumental version)

Non-English variants
The Irish tune "An Cailín Bán" appears to have evolved separately from the English tune, and appears to be earlier.

Songs that refer to "Polly Vaughn"
"Polly Von" by Peter, Paul and Mary
"One Starry Night" by Black 47
A cover version of "Polly Von" by Peter, Paul and Mary is included on Chris de Burgh's 2008 album Footsteps, a collection of covers of some of his favourite songs.

And Polly Vaughn arranged by Rodney Dillard and recorded by The Dillards on Elektra Records 1962.

Motifs

According to "The Fiddlers companion" website, the title "Molly Bawn" is an Anglicised corruption of the Gaelic "Mailí Bhán," or Fair Mary (Fairhaired Mary, White Haired Mary). The symbol of a bird to represent a departing spirit from a dead body is common in art, particularly in scenes of the death of Christ.

The idea of the spirit of a dead person returning to speak to the living is quite common in ballads. Examples include "The Unquiet Grave" and "Murder at the Red Barn".

The idea that a woman might transform herself into a swan is widely known from Tchaikovsky's ballet "Swan Lake". Again, death at the hands of a hunter is part of the story.

The word "bán" in Irish means "white", "pale", or "fair"; "bawn" is an Anglicized version, a not uncommon practice in the past.

Literature

The name Bawn appears to be quite common in Irish literature. The Colleen Bawn is a melodramatic play by Dion Boucicault. "Molly Bawn,: A comedy drama in four acts" (1920) is by Marie Doran.
There is also a song by Samuel Lover in the one-act opera "Il Paddy Whack in Italia" (1841) called "Molly Bawm". Margaret Wolfe Hungerford wrote a novel called Molly Bawn (1878). None of these stories concern women being shot in mistake for a swan.

The story is adapted and illustrated by Barry Moser in 1992 as the children's book, Polly Vaughn: A Traditional British Ballad, which is set in the Southern United States, and again as part of the 1998 children's book, Great Ghost Stories, complete with an afterword by Peter Glassman.

Samuel Lover wrote tunes as well as novels and dramas. Ciaran Tourish recorded "Molly Bawn's Reel" but it is not connected with the song. This website:
Reel suggests that Samuel Lover composed the tune.

In Canada there is company doing Whale and Puffin tours, called "Molly Bawn". There is a poem called "Polly Vaughn" in Les Barker's book "Alexander Greyhound Bell" It is presumably as parody of the song, as that is the sort of thing Les Barker does.

Music

The earliest known version of the tune for the Irish version of the song, is earlier than the earliest printing of the words. Edward Bunting's "General Collection of the Ancient Music of Ireland" appeared in 1796. He printed the Irish tune three times in his manuscripts, each time noting it was traditionally the first to by learned by beginning harpers. If this in turn really is derived from O’Carolan’s composition “Fairhaired Mary” then it must date back to 1738 or before.

Under the Irish title "An Cailín Bán" it is first mentioned in 1839 (The fair girl) as a tune rather than a song. The tune appears in "The Concertina and How to Play It" (1905) by Paul de Ville (as "Molly Bawn"), again implying it suitable for beginners to the instrument. This would suggest that the words were not married up with the Irish tune until sometime between 1840 and 1905.

The English tune is known from the time of Baring-Gould (c 1890).

In Atlantic Canada, particularly Newfoundland, a variation of the original song, titled "Molly Bawn" has been very popular through the years. This version depicts a man, reminiscing in sad despair, over the loss of his young bride many years ago. However, nowhere in the song is the manner of the girl's death mentioned. [The Leach song, not Molly Bawn,  is a version of Boating on Lough Ree by John Keegan Casey (1816-1849), From 'Amatory Poems'. ref Mudcat Discussion Forum]

Recordings

As there are three distinct ways of performing the song/tune this section has been divided up.

Section 1 – Performed as a folk song

Section 2 – Performed as a classical music arrangement

Benjamin Britten wrote many arrangements of folksongs. "Folksong Arrangements – volume 6" contains "The Shooting of His Dear". Ernest John Moeran composed "Six Folk Songs from Norfolk" in 1923. The 5th song is "The Shooting of his Dear". According to Barry Marsh, the song became
as basis for Moeran's Symphony in G minor.

Section 3 – Performed as an instrumental

Musical variants
Edward Madden wrote the words, and M. J. Fred Helf wrote the music to a song called "Colleen Bawn" in 1906. The second verse is as follows:

Colleen Bawn when I am gone I wonder will you miss me, 
Don't be afraid some other maid Will fall in love and kiss me, 
For if they do I'll think of you A waiting here and sighing, 
I'll drop my gun and start to run, And home a flying.

The business about dropping his gun almost suggests the earlier ballad, but is otherwise unrelated. The song is about a soldier who longs to return to his Irish sweetheart.

In Canada a song called "Molly Bawn" has been captured by song-collector MacEdward Leach.
MacEdward Leach. It has the line:

Oh, Molly Bawn, why leave me pining, All lonely, waiting here for you?

but makes no mention of any shooting. It is probably unrelated.

Other songs with the same tune

The air "Molly ban so Fair" (1905, Stanford/Petrie collection), is probably unrelated.

According to "The Fiddlers companion" website, there is a variant similar to O’Carolan’s composition “Fairhaired Mary.” (See Fiddlers companion)

See also
 List of Irish ballads

Further reading

 Karpeles, Maud. ed., "Cecil Sharp's Collection of English Folk Songs". (1974)
 Lomax, Alan, ed. "The Folk Songs of North America in the English Language". (1960)

References

External links

Broadsheet sources are given here:
 Broadsheet – Axon Ballads
 Harding broadsheet
 IRTRAD
 Bodley ballads

The ballad is discussed here:
 History
 Irish origins of Molly Bawn
 Columbia State University
 Polly Vaughn

The Irish tune is discussed here:
 Fiddlers companion
 Irishtune 590
 Irishtune 2963

The lyrics are given here:
 Folkinfo
 Anne Briggs version
 Lyrics
 My Own Molly Bawn
 Lyrics by Dillards
 Molly Bawn Lavery in Australia
 Lyrics
 Australian versions

There is an mp3 version sung by Eula Maxfield Garrott, recorded in 1952 here: 
 listen

Bob Dylan's version:
 Dylan

Paul de Ville's "The Concertina and How to Play It" containing Molly Bawn:
 Molly Bawn

Irish folk songs
19th-century songs
Year of song unknown
Songwriter unknown